The Alcyon was a French bicycle, automobile and motorcycle manufacturer between 1903 and 1954.

Origins 
Alcyon originated from about 1890 when Edmond Gentil started the manufacture of bicycles in Neuilly, Seine. In 1902, this was complemented by motorcycle production and in 1906, the first cars were shown at the fair "Mondial de l'Automobile" in Paris, France. Also in 1906 it founded the professional Alcyon cycling team which was active until 1955, including winning the Tour de France 6 times.

Motorcycle racing
In 1912 Alcyon competed at the Isle of Man TT races with a 348cc single-cylinder engine featuring two inlet valves and two exhaust valves. Both bikes failed to finish the Junior TT race.

Alcyon had local success in France during the 1920s, with riders such as Marc Jolly, Marcel Mourrier, Jean Durand and Lucien Lemasson winning races. During this time too, this bicycle brand got its nickname "l'intrépide Alcyon".

Voiturettes before the World War I 
Two models were shown in 1906, one a two-seat light car with single-cylinder 950 cc engine and a larger four seat model with  1.4-litre four-cylinder engine. Both engines were bought in from Gentil. The cars were advanced models with 3-speed gearboxes and shaft drive. However, the single-cylinder models were dropped in 1912 and larger models of up to 2120 cc were added to the range. By then, most of the engines were obtained from Zurcher.

The company moved to Courbevoie, Seine in 1912.

In 1954 Peugeot absorbed Alcyon.

Cyclecars between wars 

In 1914, the company's name was changed to Automobiles Alcyon.  After the war, the first model was a 1914 cc four-cylinder model, some examples of which were tuned and sold by the Lyons agent as Alycon-GLs and performed quite well in competition.  However, the car was not a success and did not sell well, so in 1923, Alcyon moved into the production of cyclecars, using 500 cc two-stroke flat-twin engines in a design bought from SIMA-Violet.  Later the company manufactured another cyclecar of similar design, thought this one featured a single-cylinder engine.  This proved a complete flop, and the company failed in 1928. Alcyon never sold cars again.

See also 
 Alcyon (cycling team)

References

External links 
Alcyon motorcycles (in French)
Alcyon motorcycles (in French)

Cycle manufacturers of France
Cyclecars
Vehicle manufacturing companies established in 1890
Vehicle manufacturing companies disestablished in 1954
Defunct motor vehicle manufacturers of France
1890 establishments in France
1954 disestablishments in France
Companies based in Île-de-France